Robert Speer may refer to:

 Robert Elliott Speer (1867–1947), American religious leader
 Robert M. Speer (born 1956), acting secretary of the US Army
 Robert Milton Speer (1838–1890), American politician from Pennsylvania
 Robert W. Speer (1855–1918), mayor of Denver, Colorado, United States